The 2016–17 North West Counties Football League season (known as the Hallmark Security League for sponsorship reasons) was the 35th in the history of the North West Counties Football League, a football competition in England. Teams were divided into two divisions: Premier Division and First Division.

Premier Division

The Premier Division consisted of 22 clubs.

The following four clubs joined the division at the start of the season:
 Barnton – promoted from the First Division
 Hanley Town – promoted from the First Division
 Irlam –  promoted from the First Division
 New Mills – relegated from the Northern Premier League First Division North

League table

Promotion criteria
To be promoted at the end of the season a team must:	
 Have applied to be considered for promotion by 30 November 2016	
 Pass a ground grading examination by 31 March 2017	
 Finish the season in a position higher than that of any other team also achieving criteria 1 and 2	
 Finish the season in one of the top three positions

The following seven clubs achieved criterion 1:
 1874 Northwich
 AFC Liverpool
 Atherton Collieries
 Bootle
 Padiham
 Runcorn Linnets
 Runcorn Town

Results

Stadia and Locations

Division One

The Division One consisted of 22 teams.

The following nine clubs joined the division at the start of the season:
 AFC Blackpool – relegated from the Premier Division
 Alsager Town – relegated from the Premier Division
 Carlisle City – promoted from the Northern Football Alliance
 Charnock Richard – promoted from the West Lancashire League
 City of Liverpool – new team
 FC Oswestry Town – promoted from the Mercian Regional League
 Prestwich Heys – promoted from the Manchester League
 Sandbach United – promoted from the Cheshire League
 Silsden – relegated from the Premier Division

League table

Results

Playoffs
Source for this subsection: NWC results archives

Stadia & Locations

 As their ground was not ready, St Helens Town played the majority of their home matches in 2016–17 at Volair Park, home of Prescot Cables, with the remainder being played at Edge Green Street, home of Ashton Town.
 Until their floodlight system was ready, Sandbach United played home evening matches at Alsager Town's ground.
 Due to fixture congestion at their home ground, Widnes played some of their home games at Townfield, home of Barnton.

League Challenge Cup
Also called the Macron Challenge Cup for sponsorship reasons.
Source for this section: NWC results archives

First round
Atherton Collieries are exempt until the second round, as holders.

* Played at Alsager

All remaining teams received byes.

Second round

* Played at Barnton

Third round

* Played at Barnoldswick

* Played at Bootle

Quarter-finals

Semi-finals

First Leg

Second Leg

City of Liverpool won on penalties following a 2–2 aggregate draw

Barnoldswick Town won 4–2 on aggregate

Final
Played at Highbury Stadium, home of Fleetwood Town

First Division Trophy
Also called the Reusch First Division Cup for sponsorship reasons.
Source for this section: NWC league archives

First round
All the remaining First Division teams received a bye to the second round.

Northern Section

Southern Section

Second round

Northern Section

Southern Section

Quarter-finals

Semi-finals

First leg

Second leg

Sandbach United won 5–4 on aggregate

City of Liverpool won 4–0 on aggregate

Final

Played at Runcorn Linnets' stadium

References

External links 
 nwcfl.com (The Official Website of The North West Counties Football League)

North West Counties Football League seasons
9